On 21 December 2017, at 4:41 pm AEDT, a driver rammed pedestrians with his car at the corner of Flinders Street and Elizabeth Street in Melbourne, Victoria, Australia, killing one person and injuring seventeen others, including himself. The sole fatality, an elderly man, died eight days after the attack.

Incident
According to witnesses and police, the driver, Saeed Noori, deliberately ran a red light then accelerated into an area with a speed limit of  where he ran into the pedestrians. His car then hit a bollard beside a tram stop. The nineteen injured included nine foreign nationals: three from South Korea, and one each from China, Italy, India, Venezuela, Ireland, and New Zealand. An off-duty officer of the Victorian Police was credited with quickly subduing the suspect who was wrestled to the ground, handcuffed, and arrested.

A second man, filming the incident, was also arrested and found to be carrying a bag containing three knives and a quantity of marijuana. It was subsequently determined that he was not directly involved in the incident.

On 21 December, Victoria Police Commander Russell Barrett stated "At this stage we believe it is a deliberate act." As a result of the incident, nineteen people were taken to a hospital. , three were in a critical condition.

One victim, Antonios Crocaris, aged 83, died in hospital on 29 December 2017.

Perpetrator
Noori, aged 32, was known to police for a 2010 assault and had a history of drug use and mental health issues. In June 2017, he was convicted and fined $1000 for driving without a license, using a mobile phone while driving and failing to answer bail. Noori was unlicensed at the time of the December incident, and was driving a vehicle that belonged to a relative.

Noori appeared in court on 23 December, charged with 18 counts of attempted murder and one count of reckless conduct endangering life; one of the attempted murder charges was upgraded to murder following Crocaris' death on 29 December. He was remanded in custody and ordered to undergo a psychiatric assessment. After his arrest he exhibited drug addiction withdrawal symptoms and was suspected to have other illnesses, including a psychiatric one. He was on medication for mental health issues.

Noori is an Australian citizen of Afghan descent who entered Australia in 2004 with six other siblings as a refugee. Noori had a two-year-old son and at the time of the attack his wife was pregnant with their second child. In an informal police interview he "spoke of dreams and voices, but also attributed some of his activities as well due to the mistreatment of Muslims". Noori also made comments in regarding Allah and ASIO following his arrest. One of Noori's co-workers at the call centre where they worked said: "There was always talk of his religious beliefs, he was very strong in that. People would say 'I believe in God' and he'd say 'you need to believe in Allah'." On 22 December the Victorian Police stated that while they had not yet determined Noori's motivations, "we haven't found anything at all to indicate his linkage or involvement with any type of extremism with any terrorism organisation or anything of a terrorist nature".

On 7 December 2018, Noori pleaded guilty to one count of murder, and 18 counts of attempted murder. Noori was sentenced in March 2019, to serve life imprisonment, with a non-parole period of 30 years.

Reactions
Prime Minister Malcolm Turnbull said that Melbourne has "special challenges", including wide streets, wide footpaths and tramways, which enable a driver to make such an attack. It would be impossible to install bollards in every part of the city.

Premier of Victoria Daniel Andrews praised the off-duty police officer who responded first, saying he "instinctively came to the aid of others, in the protection of public order, and potentially, avoiding so much other carnage".

See also

 Vehicle-ramming attack
 Timeline of major crimes in Australia
 January 2017 Melbourne car attack

References

2017 crimes in Australia
2017 road incidents
2010s in Melbourne
Attacks in Oceania in 2017
Crime in Melbourne
December 2017 crimes in Oceania
Road incidents in Australia
Vehicular rampage in Oceania
December 2017 events in Australia